Pavel Kubec (born 11 October 1966 in Louny) is a Czech sport shooter. He competed at the Summer Olympics in 1992 and 1996. In 1992, he placed fifth in the mixed trap event, and in 1996, he tied for 13th place in the men's trap event.

References

1966 births
Living people
Trap and double trap shooters
Czech male sport shooters
Shooters at the 1992 Summer Olympics
Shooters at the 1996 Summer Olympics
Olympic shooters of Czechoslovakia
Olympic shooters of the Czech Republic
People from Louny
Sportspeople from the Ústí nad Labem Region